William George Fearnsides FRS (1879–1968) was a British geologist at the University of Cambridge.

References

British geologists
Fellows of the Royal Society
1879 births
1968 deaths